Utush Mikhunan (Quechua utush a plant of the family Asteraceae, mikhuna meal, -n a suffix, Hispanicized spelling Otoshmicunan) is a  mountain in the Cordillera Central in the Andes of Peru. It lies in the Lima Region, Huarochirí Province, on the border of the districts of San Damian and San Mateo. Utush Mikhunan is situated northwest of Uqhu and Suyruqucha.

References

Mountains of Peru
Mountains of Lima Region